The Changing of the Guard (Italian: Il cambio della guardia) is a 1962 French-Italian comedy film directed by Giorgio Bianchi and starring Fernandel, Gino Cervi and Milla Sannoner.

Cast
 Fernandel as Attilio Cappelaro
 Gino Cervi as Mario Vinicio
 Franco Parenti as Virgili
 Andrea Aureli as Luciano Mezzanotte
 Franck Fernandel as Gianni Cappelaro
 Milla Sannoner as Aurora Vinicio
 Dada Gallotti as Silvana Crippa
 Gérard Herter as Ufficiale tedesco 
 Amelia Perrella as Bianca Vinicio
 Giuseppe Giannetto as Don Fausto
 Giuseppe Fortis as Luciano Crippa
 Piero Vivaldi as Vernazza 
 Jimmy il Fenomeno as Il spadassin

References

Bibliography 
 Goble, Alan. The Complete Index to Literary Sources in Film. Walter de Gruyter, 1999.

External links 
 

1962 films
French comedy films
Italian comedy films
1962 comedy films
1960s French-language films
Films directed by Giorgio Bianchi
Macaroni Combat films
1960s French films
1960s Italian films